Margaret Selina Martei was a Ghanaian politician. She was the member of parliament for the Asamankese constituency from 1965 to 1966. She also served as the General Secretary of the National Council of Ghana Women, a council that was founded in 1960 to provide "a channel for joint consultation and joint action on a national level in social, cultural, economic and political affairs of Ghanaian womanhood." Prior to becoming the General Secretary of the National Council of Ghana Women, she worked as a protocol officer at the Social Welfare Department of Ghana.

See also
 List of MPs elected in the 1965 Ghanaian parliamentary election

References

Ghanaian MPs 1965–1966
Convention People's Party (Ghana) politicians
20th-century Ghanaian politicians
Possibly living people
Year of birth missing
Date of birth missing
Place of birth missing